Segura de los Baños is a municipality and ancient spa town located in the Cuencas Mineras comarca, province of Teruel, Aragon, Spain. According to the 2010 census the municipality has a population of 40 inhabitants. Its postal code is 44793.

See also
 Cuencas Mineras
List of municipalities in Teruel

References

External links 

Segura de los Baños Town Hall website

Municipalities in the Province of Teruel
Spas